Minuscule 890 (in the Gregory-Aland numbering), Θε426 (von Soden), is a 14th-century Greek minuscule manuscript of the New Testament on paper, with a commentary. It was prepared for liturgical use.

Description 

The codex contains the text of the four Gospels, with a commentary, on 397 paper leaves (size ). The text is written in two columns per page, 38 lines per page.
The commentary is of Theophylact's authorship.
After biblical books it has liturgical books with hagiographies: Synaxarion and Menologion.

There are no  (titles of chapters) at the top of the pages.

Text 
The Greek text of the codex is a representative of the Byzantine. Kurt Aland placed it in Category V.
It was not examined according to the Claremont Profile Method.
It contains the text of the Pericope Adulterae.

History 

According to C. R. Gregory it was written in the 14th century. Currently the manuscript is dated by the INTF to the 14th century. The manuscript once belonged to Cardinal Bessarion, who presented it to the city of Venice. Currently the manuscript is housed at the Biblioteca Marciana (Gr. Z. 31 (321)), in Venice.

The manuscript was added to the list of New Testament manuscripts by Scrivener (890e) and Gregory (890e). Gregory saw it in 1886. It is not cited in critical editions of the Greek New Testament (UBS4, NA28).

See also 

 List of New Testament minuscules (1–1000)
 Biblical manuscript
 Textual criticism
 Minuscule 889
 Minuscule 891

References

Further reading

External links 
 

Greek New Testament minuscules
14th-century biblical manuscripts